Hans-Karl Freiherr von Esebeck (10 July 1892 – 5 January 1955) was a German general who commanded the 15th Panzer Division in the Afrika Korps.

Esebeck had knowledge of and was sympathetic to the anti-Hitler conspiracy in the military. He was arrested on 21 July 1944 and spent the rest of the war in concentration camps. Liberated at the end of the war he lived the rest of his life in poverty and died on 5 January 1955.

Awards

 Knight's Cross of the Iron Cross on 4 July 1940 as Oberst and commander of the 6. Schützen-Brigade

References

Citations

Bibliography

 Mitcham, Samuel W. (2007). Rommel's Desert Commanders — The Men Who Served the Desert Fox, North Africa, 1941–42. Mechanicsburg, PA: Stackpole Books. .
 

1892 births
1955 deaths
People from the Province of Brandenburg
Barons of Germany
German Army personnel of World War I
20th-century Freikorps personnel
Generals of Panzer Troops
Recipients of the clasp to the Iron Cross, 1st class
Recipients of the Gold German Cross
Recipients of the Knight's Cross of the Iron Cross
Recipients of the Order of the Cross of Liberty, 2nd Class
Nazi concentration camp survivors
Prussian Army personnel
Reichswehr personnel
Military personnel from Potsdam